"The Summer" is a song by Australian singer-songwriter Josh Pyke. It was released in February 2009 as the third and final single from Pyke's second studio album, Chimney's Afire (2008). In the song Pyke weaves stories from childhood memories and idyllic dreams of a life by the sea. It was certified gold in Australia in 2020.

Certification

References

Songs about nostalgia
Songs about oceans and seas
2009 singles
2008 songs
Josh Pyke songs